The Bintaro rail crash occurred on 9 December 2013 when a KRL Commuterline train crashed into a Pertamina gasoline tanker at a railroad crossing in Bintaro, Jakarta, Indonesia on Monday morning, causing at least one female-only carriage to overturn and burst into flames. At least 7 people were killed (including the three train drivers) and another 63 were wounded in the crash.

See also
1987 Bintaro train crash

References

Railway accidents in 2013
2013 disasters in Indonesia
Accidents and incidents involving Kereta Api Indonesia
2010s in Jakarta
Transport in Jakarta
December 2013 events in Asia
Level crossing incidents in Indonesia
2013 road incidents